The builder pattern is a design pattern designed to provide a flexible solution to various object creation problems in object-oriented programming. The intent of the builder design pattern is to separate the construction of a complex object from its representation. It is one of the Gang of Four design patterns.

Overview
The Builder design pattern is one of the Design Patterns that describe how to solve recurring design problems in object-oriented software.

The Builder design pattern solves problems like:
 How can a class (the same construction process) create different representations of a complex object?
 How can a class that includes creating a complex object be simplified?

Creating and assembling the parts of a complex object directly within a class is inflexible.  It commits the class to creating a particular representation of the complex object and makes it impossible to change the representation later independently from (without having to change) the class.

The Builder design pattern describes how to solve such problems:
 Encapsulate creating and assembling the parts of a complex object in a separate  Builder object.
 A class delegates object creation to a Builder object instead of creating the objects directly.

A class (the same construction process) can delegate to different Builder objects to create different representations of a complex object.

Definition
The intent of the Builder design pattern is to separate the construction of a complex object from its representation. By doing so, the same construction process can create different representations.

Advantages 
Advantages of the Builder pattern include:
 Allows you to vary a product's internal representation.
 Encapsulates code for construction and representation.
 Provides control over steps of construction process.

Disadvantages 
Disadvantages of the Builder pattern include:
 A distinct ConcreteBuilder must be created for each type of product.
 Builder classes must be mutable.
 May hamper/complicate dependency injection.

Structure

UML class and sequence diagram 

In the above UML class diagram, 
the Director class doesn't create and assemble the ProductA1 and ProductB1 objects directly.
Instead, the Director refers to the Builder interface for building (creating and assembling) the parts of a complex object,
which makes the Director independent of which concrete classes are instantiated (which representation is created).
The Builder1 class implements the Builder interface by creating and assembling the ProductA1 and ProductB1 objects.

The UML sequence diagram shows the run-time interactions: 
The Director object calls buildPartA() on the Builder1 object, which creates and assembles the ProductA1 object.
Thereafter, 
the Director calls buildPartB() on Builder1, which creates and assembles the ProductB1 object.

Class diagram 

Builder
Abstract interface for creating objects (product).

ConcreteBuilder
Provides implementation for Builder. It is an object able to construct other objects. Constructs and assembles parts to build the objects.

Examples 
A C# example:
/// <summary>
/// Represents a product created by the builder
/// </summary>
public class Bicycle
{
    public string Make { get; set; }
    public string Model { get; set; }
    public int Height { get; set; }
    public string Colour { get; set; }

    public Bicycle(string make, string model, string colour, int height)
    {
        Make = make;
        Model = model;
        Colour = colour;
        Height = height;
    }
}

/// <summary>
/// The builder abstraction
/// </summary>
public interface IBicycleBuilder
{
    string Colour { get; set; }
    int Height { get; set; }

    Bicycle GetResult();
}

/// <summary>
/// Concrete builder implementation
/// </summary>
public class GTBuilder : IBicycleBuilder
{
    public string Colour { get; set; }
    public int Height { get; set; }

    public Bicycle GetResult()
    {
        return Height == 29 ? new Bicycle("GT", "Avalanche", Colour, Height) : null;        
    }
}

/// <summary>
/// The director
/// </summary>
public class MountainBikeBuildDirector
{
    private IBicycleBuilder _builder;
    public MountainBikeBuildDirector(IBicycleBuilder builder) 
    {
        _builder = builder;
    }

    public void Construct()
    {
        _builder.Colour = "Red";
        _builder.Height = 29;
    }

    public Bicycle GetResult()
	{
		return this._builder.GetResult();
	}
}

public class Client
{
    public void DoSomethingWithBicycles()
    {
        var director = new MountainBikeBuildDirector(new GTBuilder());
        // Director controls the stepwise creation of product and returns the result.
        Bicycle myMountainBike = director.Construct().GetResult();
    }
}

The Director assembles a bicycle instance in the example above, delegating the construction to a separate builder object that has been given to the Director by the Client.

See also 
 Currying
 FluentQueryBuilder

References

External links

Software design patterns
Articles with example Java code